Alican Karataş (born September 9, 1991) is a Turkish curler, and member of the Turkey men's national curling team.

He began curling at Sital Spor in Ankara in 2009. Karataş curled with the Turkish national team, which captured the gold medal at the 5th Debrecen Bonspiel. He skipped at the European Curling Championships-Group B in Karlstad, Sweden following his team's promotion from Group C.

Karakaş took part at the 2013 European Junior Curling Challenge#Men in Prague, Czech Republic, which was the qualifying tournament for the 2013 World Junior Curling Championships. He skipped a 4-2 win in the round robin of Group A, tying with the Italian team. Losing in the tiebreaker game, he failed to reach the semifinals. He ranked 4th of 12 competitors.

Achievements

References

External links
 

Place of birth missing (living people)
Living people
Turkish male curlers
1991 births
21st-century Turkish people